Derek William Gibbs (22 December 1934 – 19 November 2009) was an English professional footballer who played as a forward.

Club career
Born in Fulham, Gibbs started his career with South Ruislip and Ruislip Manor, before joining Chelsea, where he made his debut in 1957. After 23 appearances for The Blues, in which he scored five goals, Gibbs moved to Leyton Orient in 1960. After escaping injury following a car accident, Gibbs moved to Queens Park Rangers in 1963. His spell with The R's was unsuccessful, as he failed to score in 27 league appearances before moving to non-league Romford, where he finished his career.

Death
Gibbs died on 19 November 2009 in Bridgend, Wales.

References

1934 births
2009 deaths
Footballers from Fulham
Footballers from Greater London
English footballers
Association football forwards
Chelsea F.C. players
Queens Park Rangers F.C. players
Romford F.C. players